XHPMEN-FM is a radio station on 93.9 FM in Ciudad del Carmen, Campeche, Mexico. It is owned by NRM Comunicaciones and operated by Grupo Radiorama, known as Retro FM with a Spanish classic hits format.

History
XHPMEN was awarded in the IFT-4 radio auction of 2017. NRM chairman Edilberto Huesca Perrotín paid 5.737 and 5.687 million pesos and came away with XHPMEN and XHPCDC-FM 92.3. The station signed on August 1, 2020, some six months after the transmitter began testing, taking on the Retro format that had aired on XHMAB-FM 101.3 prior to that station's lease to El Heraldo Radio but ended on March 1, 2022.

References

External links

Radio stations in Campeche
Radio stations established in 2020
2020 establishments in Mexico